Mouchaak is a Bengali web series on  OTT platform Hoichoi. It is a dark humour series directed by Sayantan Ghosal and produced by Missing Screw Productions. The cast includes Monami Ghosh, making her web series debut as Mou Boudi, Kanchan Mallick, Sourav Chatterjee, Ujan Chatterjee, Suhotra Mukhopadhyay, Debapriyo Mukherjee, Apratim Chatterjee, and Jammy Banerjee.

Plot
Mouchaak presents a fateful night filled with accidental deaths, a lottery ticket worth 1.5 crores rupees, and a few strange characters. The lottery ticket is the only way Mou Boudi could live her life on her own terms.

Cast 
 Monami Ghosh as Mou
 Kanchan Mullick as Tarak
 Debopriyou Mukherjee as Toton
 Jammy Banerjee as Naren
 Sourav Chatterjee as Bimal
 Apratim Chatterjee as Poltu
 Soumyadeep Banerjee as Naren
 Suhotra Mukhopadhyay as Laltu

Season 1 (2021)
On June 8, 2021, Hoichoi released the official trailer. On June 18, 2021, Hoichoi released the first season with seven episodes.

Episodes

References

External links

Indian web series
2021 web series debuts
Bengali-language web series
Hoichoi original programming